Châteauneuf is a commune in the Loire department in central France, midway between Saint-Etienne and Lyon on the A-47 motorway.

Châteauneuf is home to one of the units of ArcelorMittal subsidiary Industeel France.

Population

See also
Communes of the Loire department

References

Communes of Loire (department)